In geometry, the great dodecicosacron (or great dipteral trisicosahedron) is the dual of the great dodecicosahedron (U63). It has 60 intersecting bow-tie-shaped faces.

Proportions
The dihedral angle equals . The ratio between the lengths of the long edges and the short ones equals , which is the golden ratio. Part of each face lies inside the solid, hence is invisible in solid models.

References

External links 

 Uniform polyhedra and duals

Dual uniform polyhedra